Manipuri Brahmins or Meitei Brahmins are the Brahmins who speak the Meitei language (aka Manipuri language) as their native tongue and mainly reside in the valley areas of Manipur.

Description
Manipuri Brahmin origins stretch as far as Bengal, Odisha and other parts of India. Each Brahmin family within the community belongs to a specific gotra indicating their origin. They have many clans of Maithil Brahmins.

Ethnicity, origin and history
The recording of the migration of Indo Aryan Brahmins from other parts of India, including Bengal, Mithila, Uttar Pradesh, Gujarat, and Odisha to the Manipur Valley was started from the 15th century. The appearance of Brahmins in Manipur in the 15th century may be due to the rise of Muslim power in Bengal. Followed by a steady stream of Brahmin migration to Manipur who were brought in based on their requirements after the adoption of Vaishnavism in Manipur. These Brahmins learned the Manipuri language, mixed the customs they brought in with the local customs which are acceptable to Brahmin culture and became a part of the larger Manipuri society.

Notable people
Aribam Shyam Sharma, filmmaker and composer.
Atombapu Sharma, Sanskrit scholar, journalist and social reformer.
Bachaspatimayum Jayantakumar Sharma, Manipuri music lyricist.
Gurumayum Bonny Sharma, Manipuri film actor.
 Hanjabam Radhe Devi, Padmashree awardee, traditional bridal wear designer.
 Sanathoiba Sharma, Padmashree awardee, Manipuri Martial arts guru.
Shanglakpam Nilakanta Sharma,  Indian field hockey player.

References

Brahmin communities by language
Brahmin communities across India
Ethnic groups in Manipur
Indian castes